Wiktor Ormicki (born Wiktor Rudolf Nusbaum, 1898–1941) was a Polish geographer and cartographer, and a university professor. A specialist in economical geography and demography, he served at various posts in the Jagiellonian University, Wolna Wszechnica, Higher Trade School of Kraków and Lwów University. Arrested by the Germans during World War II in Sonderaktion Krakau, he was murdered in the Mauthausen-Gusen concentration camp.

1898 births
1941 deaths
Polish Jews who died in the Holocaust
Academic staff of Jagiellonian University
Academic staff of the University of Lviv
People who died in Mauthausen concentration camp
Polish civilians killed in World War II
Polish geographers
Polish people executed in Nazi concentration camps
Executed people from Lesser Poland Voivodeship
Jewish scientists
20th-century geographers